Bestum is a neighbourhood in Ullern in Oslo, Norway. Before the residential area arose, Bestum was mainly an agricultural area. The name origins from the Middle Ages. Bestum was served by a station named "Bestun" and the tram stop Bestum, but both are now closed. The residential houses in the area are drawn in Swiss chalet style.

References

External links
Bestum Vel

Neighbourhoods of Oslo